Kelsey Curd Ladt is the youngest person to ever graduate from the University of Kentucky. She graduated summa cum laude in the spring of 2009 with a degree in biology, and is considered by many to be a child prodigy. At 13 Kelsey was probably the youngest NIH researcher ever

References 

Year of birth missing (living people)
Living people
University of Kentucky alumni
Kentucky women biologists
21st-century American women